Suzanne Bischoff van Heemskerck (born 31 July 1950, The Hague) is a Dutch politician.

See also
List of Dutch politicians

References

External link

1950 births
Living people
Politicians from The Hague
Protestant Church Christians from the Netherlands
Democrats 66 politicians
Members of the House of Representatives (Netherlands)
Members of the Senate (Netherlands)
Dutch women in politics
Dutch civil servants
Utrecht University alumni